Andrew L. Browne (born 7 July 1990) is an Australian rules football player in the Australian Football League, who played for the Richmond Football Club.

Browne was drafted from the Murray Bushrangers in the TAC Cup by Richmond in the 2009 Rookie draft using pick 39.  Originally from Mansfield, Victoria, he was a surprise selection in the opening round of the 2009 AFL season after playing only two games during the preseason. He represented Victoria Country in the 2008 AFL Under 18 Championships and played in the Bushrangers' 2008 TAC Cup premiership winning side.

After the completion of the 2012 season Richmond officially announced Browne's delisting from its senior list.

Notes

External links

SuperStats profile

1990 births
Living people
Richmond Football Club players
Coburg Football Club players
Australian rules footballers from Victoria (Australia)
Murray Bushrangers players
Mansfield Football Club players